Positech Games is a video game developer based in the United Kingdom. The company was founded in 1997 and belongs to the former Lionhead Studios programmer Cliff Harris. The company has published a number of PC games. One of the most notable publications by Positech is the strategy game of policy shift Democracy. Positech is known for making complex simulation games.

Harris has been, and remains, an outspoken critic of the labour practices of the principal of the games industry "triple A", particularly for its culture of long hours and lack of contact between developers and players. In August 2008, Harris wrote an entry on his blog aimed at "pirates" asking them why they used unlicensed games. The response was overwhelming, resulting in thousands of posts on sites like Facebook, Slashdot and Reddit. By way of response, Harris promised to reduce the prices of their games, not to use any DRM, and take care of the concerns of the responders on the weight of the demos and quality of gaming.

As well as developing games directly, Positech has also been involved in publishing a number of third party games, such as Redshirt, Big Pharma Political Animals and Shadowhand. In addition to publishing these titles, Positech has also invested along with other parties, in indie games including Duskers and A Night in the Woods.

Games
 Democracy
 Democracy 2
 Democracy 3
 Democracy 4
Democracy 3: Africa
 Asteroid Miner (also known as Star Miner)
 Kombat Kars
 Kudos
 Minefield
 Kudos: Rock Legend
 Saucer Attack
 Battle Space 3001
 Starship Tycoon (also known as StarLines Inc.)
 Kudos 2 
 Oval Office: Commander in Chief
 Redshirt (video game)
 Rocky Racers
 Gratuitous Space Battles
 Gratuitous Space Battles 2
 Gratuitous Tank Battles
 Big Pharma
 Production Line
 Political Animals
 shadowhand

References

External links
 
 Interview with CasualGameDesign
 Interview with GamaSutra
 Interview with Gibbage

Video game companies of the United Kingdom
Video game publishers
British companies established in 1997
Video game companies established in 1997
Privately held companies of the United Kingdom